Iganga is a town in the Eastern Region of Uganda. It is the main municipal, administrative, and commercial center of Iganga District.

Location
Iganga is located in Uganda's Busoga sub-region.

The coordinates of the town of Iganga are:0°36'54.0"N, 33°29'06.0"E (Latitude:0.6150; Longitude:33.4850).

Overview
Points of interest in the town include the DevelopNet Iganga Project, which houses an Internet cafe and a community center for the Iganga District NGO/CBO Forum. International Hand Iganga is a non-governmental organization operating in the area supporting education and community development. Iganga town has several Internet cafes, several guest houses, and a bustling market in the center of town adjacent to the taxi park. Religious buildings like churches and mosques.

Transport
Iganga is served by a station on the Uganda Railways. The highway from the city of Jinja, passes through Iganga, continuing on to Bugiri and Tororo, as  the Jinja–Iganga–Bugiri–Tororo Road.

Population
In 2002, the national census estimated Iganga's population at 39,500. In 2010, the Uganda Bureau of Statistics (UBOS) estimated the population at 51,800. In 2011, UBOS estimated the mid-year population of Iganga at 53,700. In 2014, the national population census put Iganga's population at 53,870.

In 2015, the population of the town was estimated at 56,500. In 2020, the mid-year population of Iganga Town was projected at 65,500. The population grew at an average annual rate of 3.0 percent, between 2015 and 2020.

Health
Iganga General Hospital also known as Nakavule Hospital,
serves the residents of the municipality of Iganga, as well as the rest of the district.

The hospital was rated to be a leading performer of general hospitals in Uganda financially, though its facilities and infrastructure are in need of updates. The hospital was renovated as part of a seven hospital renovation project by the Ugandan government in November 2015.

Efforts have been made to establish emergency medical services in Iganga, most notably with the development of a lay first responder program in 2016 by international collaborators from Washington University in St. Louis, LFR International and the Uganda Red Cross Society.

Points of interest
The following points of interest lie within or near Iganga:

1. Iganga District Administration headquarters

2. Iganga Town Council offices

3.

4. Iganga General Hospital, a 120-bed public hospital funded by the Uganda Ministry of Health

5. Iganga Railway Station

6. Iganga central market.

Notable people
 Andrew Kiiza Kaluya Namitego: He is the elected member of parliament for Kigulu County South, Iganga District.

See also
 Sleeping sickness
 List of cities and towns in Uganda

References

External links
 International Hand Foundation
 DevelopNet Iganga homepage
 Busoga University homepage

Populated places in Eastern Region, Uganda
Cities in the Great Rift Valley
Busoga
Iganga District